Kim Crane Hammond (October 12, 1944 – July 16, 2017) was a judge in Flagler County, Florida and was a quarterback for Florida State University. For Seminole fans, he is best remembered for quarterbacking the team's first victory over rival Florida in Gainesville, 21–16. Hammond died on Sunday, July 16, 2017, after suffering from illnesses for several years.

Early life and high school career
Hammond attended Melbourne High School in Melbourne, Florida, where he played football, baseball and basketball.

College career
After a year as a redshirt, then two as backup to Gary Pajcic, Hammond got his first start in the second game of his senior year against Alabama. The Crimson Tide was riding a 21-game winning streak, but Hammond and the Seminoles were ready. FSU had lost in 1965 by the score of 21-0, but instead of being dominated, they embarrassed Bear Bryant by scoring more points than Alabama had allowed the entire previous season. The final score was 37-37, but the tie was probably the most impressive game the Seminoles had played. FSU lost its next game to North Carolina State 20-10 before winning the remaining 7 regular season games. As a reward for their 7-2-1 season, they were invited to the Gator Bowl in Jacksonville. Hammond played in the 1967 Senior Bowl and was named MVP. He was a second-team All-American quarterback in his senior year and finished fifth in Heisman Trophy voting.
The Florida State University Hall of Fame inducted him in 1978.

Gator Bowl
In 1997, Hammond was inducted into the Gator Bowl Hall of Fame for his performance in the 1967 postseason game against Penn State. The Nittany Lions were ranked 10th nationally under second year coach Joe Paterno, and favored by two touchdowns over the upstart Noles. Down 17-0 at halftime, the Seminole defense shut down their opponents and Hammond threw for 362 yards and one touchdown and ran for another as FSU scored 17 unanswered points for a tie. Hammond was named MVP for the game.

Professional career
A 6th round selection (142nd overall pick) of the 1968 Common Draft, Hammond played two seasons in the American Football League, for the Miami Dolphins and the Boston Patriots, respectively, in 1968 and 1969.  Hammond played in six games in his short professional career, completing 15 of 32 passes for 147 total yards, no touchdowns, and two interceptions.  He also scored two points on a conversion. Hammond was also on the roster of the World Football League's Jacksonville Sharks in 1974. Hammond did not attempt a pass for the Sharks, and he was sacked twice for a net loss of 15 yards.

Judicial career
After attending Florida State University, Hammond was in private practice in Daytona Beach for several years. He became a judge in 1979. The Kim C. Hammond Justice Center in Bunnell is named in his honor. Judge Hammond was also the first president of the "National Seminole Club" when the Seminole Boosters merged with the Alumni organization in 1972.

See also
Other American Football League players

References

External links
pro-football-reference.com

1944 births
2017 deaths
Players of American football from Miami
American football quarterbacks
Florida State Seminoles football players
Melbourne High School alumni
Miami Dolphins players
Boston Patriots players
Florida state court judges
American Football League players
20th-century American judges